Denmark competed at the 2022 World Games held in Birmingham, United States from 7 to 17 July 2022. Athletes representing Denmark won four gold medals, three silver medals and three bronze medals. The country finished in 17th place in the medal table.

Medalists

Competitors
The following is the list of number of competitors in the Games.

Air sports

Denmark competed in air sports.

Archery

Denmark competed in archery.

Boules sports 

Denmark competed in boules sports.

Bowling

Denmark won two gold medals in bowling.

Canoe marathon

Denmark won three medals in canoe marathon.

Dancesport

Denmark competed in dancesport.

Flag football

Denmark competed in flag football.

Ju-jitsu

Denmark won three medals in ju-jitsu.

Lifesaving

Denmark won one gold medal in lifesaving.

Orienteering

Denmark competed in orienteering.

Powerlifting

Denmark competed in powerlifting.

Trampoline gymnastics

Denmark won one bronze medal in trampoline gymnastics.

Water skiing

Denmark competed in water skiing.

References

Nations at the 2022 World Games
2022
World Games